New East Prussia was a province of the Kingdom of Prussia from 1795 to 1807. It was created out of territory annexed in the Third Partition of the Polish–Lithuanian Commonwealth and included parts of Masovia, Podlaskie, Trakai voivodeship and Žemaitija.

Geography
New East Prussia encompassed territory between East Prussia and the Vistula, Bug, and Neman rivers.

1807 Treaties of Tilsit
Following Napoleon Bonaparte's victory in the War of the Fourth Coalition and the Greater Poland Uprising of 1806 the Province of New East Prussia was ceded according to the 1807 Treaties of Tilsit:
The area around Białystok was ceded to the Russian Empire, becoming the Belostok Oblast.
The Płock Department and the remainder of the Białystok Department (Łomża Department) became part of the Duchy of Warsaw, a French client state

Administrative divisions

Białystok Department
Bialystok
Bielsk
Bobrz
Dombrowa
Drohiczyn
Kalwary
Lomza
Mariampol
Surasz
Wygry
Płock Department
Lipno
Mlawa
Ostrolenka
Plozk
Przasnik
Pultusk
Wyszogrod

References

External links
FAQ for Posen, South Prussia, and New East Prussia

History of Masovia
Provinces of Prussia
1795 establishments in Prussia
1807 disestablishments in Prussia
Prussian Partition